Shooting was contested at the 2013 Summer Universiade from July 12 to 17 at the Rifle Shooting Range and the Sviyaga Shooting Range in Kazan, Russia.

Medal summary

Medal table

Men's events

Individual

Team

Women's events

Individual

Team

References

External links
2013 Summer Universiade – Shooting
Results book

2013 in shooting sports
2013 Summer Universiade events
Shooting at the Summer Universiade